Arthur Largura Chaves (born 29 January 2001), known as Arthur Chaves, is a Brazilian footballer who plays as a central defender for Portuguese club Académico de Viseu.

Club career
Born in Florianópolis, Santa Catarina, Arthur Chaves joined Avaí's youth setup in 2012, aged eleven. He was promoted to the first team in February 2021, and made his senior debut on 4 April, coming on as a second-half substitute in a 1–0 Campeonato Catarinense away win over Metropolitano.

On 1 December 2021, after playing in one league match as his side achieved promotion, Arthur Chaves renewed his contract with Avaí until 2024. He was a regular starter in the 2022 Catarinense, before making his Série A debut on 10 April by starting in a 1–0 home win over América Mineiro.

On 18 August 2022, Arthur Chaves signed a five-year contract with Académico de Viseu in Portugal.

Career statistics

Honours
Avaí
Campeonato Catarinense: 2021

References

External links
Avaí profile 

2001 births
Sportspeople from Florianópolis
Living people
Brazilian footballers
Association football defenders
Avaí FC players
Académico de Viseu F.C. players
Campeonato Brasileiro Série A players
Campeonato Brasileiro Série B players
Campeonato Catarinense players
Liga Portugal 2 players
Brazilian expatriate footballers
Expatriate footballers in Portugal
Brazilian expatriate sportspeople in Portugal